Kayes is a city in Mali.

Kayes may also refer to:
 Kayes Airport, airport in Kayes, Mali
 Kayes Cercle, administrative region in Mali
 Kayes Region, region in Mali
 Kayes, Republic of the Congo, town in the Republic of the Congo
 Madingo Kayes, archaeological site in the Republic of the Congo
 Madingo-Kayes, town in the Republic of the Congo
 
See also:
 Kayes (surname)